Princess Marie Frederica Wilhelmina of Hesse-Kassel (6 September 1804 – 1 January 1888) was a Duchess consort of Saxe-Meiningen by marriage to Bernhard II, Duke of Saxe-Meiningen.  She was the daughter of William II, Elector of Hesse and Princess Augusta of Prussia.

Life

Marie Frederica was one of six children born to William II, Elector of Hesse by his first spouse Augusta of Prussia. However, her only sibling to live past the age of five was Frederick William, Elector of Hesse.  In addition, she had eight half-siblings by her father's second marriage to Emilie Ortlöpp, Countess of Reichenbach-Lessonitz.

Duchess
In 1822, Marie, through the suggestion of her mother's friend, the Swedish countess Charlotta Aurora De Geer, was considered a possible bride for Oscar I of Sweden, but the following year, he married Josephine of Leuchtenberg instead.

On 23 March 1825, Marie married Bernhard II, Duke of Saxe-Meiningen. He was a son of Georg I Frederick Karl, Duke of Saxe-Meiningen and Luise Eleonore of Hohenlohe-Langenburg, as well as a brother of Queen Adelaide of the United Kingdom.  He and Marie had two surviving children.  Her son Georg would remain an only child for seventeen years until the birth of his sister Augusta in 1843.

Marie Frederica was widowed in 1882 and died on 1 January 1888, six years later.

Issue

Ancestry

References

Sources

1804 births
1888 deaths
House of Saxe-Meiningen
Duchesses of Saxe-Meiningen
Landgravines of Hesse-Kassel
Daughters of monarchs